"The Grave" is episode 72 of the American television anthology series The Twilight Zone. It originally aired on October 27, 1961 on CBS. This is one of two episodes that were filmed during season two but held over for broadcast until season three, the other being "Nothing in the Dark".

Opening narration

Plot
The outlaw Pinto Sykes is ambushed and killed by the men of a small town in the Old West. Some time later, gunfighter Conny Miller, who had been hired to track down Sykes, arrives in town. He goes to the saloon where the men who hired him are gathered, and is angry to learn that they had killed Sykes themselves. Moreover, on his deathbed Sykes accused Miller of being a coward, saying he left a clue he was in Albuquerque, New Mexico, and Miller never followed it up, presumably being afraid to confront Sykes. He also made a vow to reach up and grab Miller if he ever came near his grave.

Miller says that Sykes was a liar, claiming he went to Albuquerque and found no sign that Sykes had ever been there, and also denies that he is at all frightened by Sykes' threat of vengeance from beyond the grave. After Sykes' vengeful sister Ione confronts Miller, the men say they are not convinced of Miller's story, openly admitting they themselves are frightened of Sykes. They bet Miller $20 that he is too scared to visit the grave. He is to stick a knife into the burial mound as proof of his visit; he then departs into the cold, windy darkness. He reaches the grave at midnight and plants the knife as instructed, but is suddenly pulled down as he attempts to leave. 

When Miller fails to return the next day, Ione and the townsmen travel to the cemetery in search of him. They find him lying dead atop Sykes' grave, the knife driven through his coattail and pinning him to the ground. One man, Steinhart, theorizes that Miller had not buttoned his coat and that the wind blew its tail over the grave; after planting the knife, Miller mistook the pinned tail for Sykes' grasping hand and died of fright. However, Ione demonstrates that the wind direction that night would have blown Miller's coattail away from the grave, not over it, and then laughs mockingly at the stupefied men.

Closing narration

Cast
Lee Marvin as Conny Miller
James Best as Johnny Rob
Strother Martin as Mothershed
Elen Willard as Ione Sykes
Lee Van Cleef as Steinhart
William Challee as Jason
Stafford Repp as Ira Broadly
Larry Johns as Townsman
Dick Geary as Pinto Sykes

"The Path Through the Cemetery"
Leonard Q. Ross published a similar story in 1941, called "The Path Through the Cemetery" " The tale, set in Imperial Russia, describes a very timid man, named Ivan, who responds to a similar challenge from a Cossack officer in the Tsar's Army (some printings identify this officer as a captain, some as a lieutenant) with the sword he receives from the Cossack officer for the purpose—and who meets a similar fate.

"The Dare"
Maria Leach authored a compilation of ghost stories called The Thing at the Foot of the Bed and Other Scary Tales in 1959 that included a story called "The Dare", in which a group of kids sitting in front of a fire telling ghost stories dare one of the group to go to the grave of a man who was just buried earlier that day. The boy takes the dare, states he will stick a knife in the grave to prove he was there, and then proceeds to meet the same fate that night.

References
 DeVoe, Bill. (2008). Trivia from The Twilight Zone. Albany, GA: Bear Manor Media. 
 Grams, Martin. (2008). The Twilight Zone: Unlocking the Door to a Television Classic. Churchville, MD: OTR Publishing. 
 Ross, Leonard Q. "The Path Through the Cemetery." Saturday Review of Literature.; 29 Nov 1941, Vol. 24, p12. .

External links

1961 American television episodes
The Twilight Zone (1959 TV series season 3) episodes